In knitting, grafting is the joining of two knitted fabrics using yarn and a needle in one of three types of seams:

 selvage-to-selvage seam,
 selvage-to-end ("wales") seam, or 
 end-to-end ("wale-to-wale") seam.

The Kitchener stitch is a common method for the third type of seam. The yarn follows the route of a row of ordinary knitting. This is often done when closing off a knitted sock at the toe. The technique is named after Horatio Herbert Kitchener, though the technique was practiced long before.

See also
Three needle bindoff

References

 June Hemmons Hiatt (1988) The Principles of Knitting, Simon & Schuster, pp. 361–378.

External links 

 Tutorial on Kitchener Stitch on Knitty.com by Theresa Vinson Stenersen
 Kitchener Stitch Tutorial on KnittingHelp.com section for miscellaneous techniques—includes video

Knitting stitches
Seams